Pan Nu Thway is a Burmese melodrama television series. It aired on MRTV-4, from November 6, 2013, to March 31, 2015, on Mondays to Fridays at 19:15 for 121 episodes, for two seasons. Season 1 aired on from November 6, 2013, to January 29, 2014 for 61 episodes and season 2 aired from January 6 to March 31, 2015 for 60 episodes.

Cast and characters

Main cast
May Myint Mo as Pan Nu Thway (S1, S2)
Myat Thu Kyaw as Tayza Min Maung (S1, S2)
May Mi Kyaw Kyaw as Honey Khin (S1, S2)
Sai Nay Phyo as Pyae Sone (S1, S2)
Chue Lay as Chue Shwe Li (S2)
Kyaw Hsu as Htoo Wai (S2)
Lin Myat as Banyar (S2)

Supporting
Khin Moht Moht Aye as Daw Khin Than Kywal (Honey Khin's mother) (S1, S2)
Theingi Htun as Daw Palae (Pan Nu Thway's mother) (S1, S2)
Daung Wai as Arnold (S1, S2)
Min Khant (child actor) as Phoe Lone (S1, S2)
Goon Pone Gyi as Kyi Kyi Thit (S1, S2)
Zaw Win Naing as U Htun Tauk (S2)
Shwe Eain Min as Htar Htar Wai (S2)
Shoon Pyae Paing as Daw Khin Ma Ma (S2)
Thet Oo Ko as Thiha (S2)

References

External links

Burmese television series
MRTV (TV network) original programming